Hwajeong station may refer to the following railroad stations in South Korea.

 Hwajeong station (Goyang)
 Hwajeong station (Gwangju)